Edmund Leverett Morris (4 February 1923 – 3 January 2003) was a Canadian politician, broadcaster and university administrator.

Early life and education
Born in Halifax, Nova Scotia, he was the only son of Leverett Morris and Catherine Larsen. He attended school at Saint Mary's Boys School. After graduating high school, he pursued an undergraduate and graduate degree in political science from Dalhousie University. After graduation, he went to work for a local radio station in Halifax.

Political career
In the 1953 federal election, Morris made his first attempt into politics when he ran as the Progressive Conservative candidate in the electoral district of Halifax. Although he lost, he continued to be involved in politics at the local level, and offered himself for election again in the 1957 election, in which he was elected to the House of Commons of Canada.

Between 1957 and 1963, Morris represented the riding of Halifax in the House of Commons. He held the positions of Parliamentary Secretary to the Postmaster General, and Parliamentary Secretary to the Minister of Commerce.

In 1963, Morris was appointed as chief assistant to the President of Saint Mary's University in Halifax, Nova Scotia. Saint Mary's, a Catholic university administered by the Society of Jesus, saw  Morris serving as one of the few lay persons on staff. Morris was instrumental in large scale building programs at the university throughout the 1960s as well as the eventual change of the university to non-denominational institution in 1970. Morris served as Interim President of Saint Mary's University during the school year 1970–1971.

Between 1974 and 1980, Morris served as Mayor of the City of Halifax.

After stepping down as Mayor of Halifax, Morris, entered provincial politics by standing as the Progressive Conservative candidate in the urban riding of Halifax Needham, during a by-election, on 6 May 1980. Morris won the seat by 26 votes. Morris was re-elected in 1981 and 1984. Morris served as Minister of Intergovernmental Affairs, Municipal Affairs, Fisheries and Social Services.

Morris received an honorary degree, Doctor of Civil Law, from Saint Mary's University in 1986.

Death
Morris died on 3 January 2003, at age 79.

Personal life
He was married to Lorraine Ware and had six children.

Electoral record

References

Beck, J. Murray. Politics of Nova Scotia: Vol. Two: Murray to Buchanan, 1896-1988. Tantallon, Nova Scotia: Four East Publications, 1988.

External links
 

1923 births
2003 deaths
Canadian Roman Catholics
Canadian radio personalities
Dalhousie University alumni
Members of the Executive Council of Nova Scotia
Members of the House of Commons of Canada from Nova Scotia
Mayors of Halifax, Nova Scotia
Progressive Conservative Association of Nova Scotia MLAs
Progressive Conservative Party of Canada MPs